Crosscut.com is a nonprofit news website based in Seattle, Washington, United States. Its content is mainly news analysis rather than breaking news like other online newspapers or blogs.

History

Founding

Crosscut was founded in 2007 by David Brewster, who also started the Seattle Weekly in 1976 and launched Town Hall Seattle in 1999. Other investors included former Seattle mayor Paul Schell, former Seattle City Councilman and KING-TV commentator Jim Compton, and former KING Broadcasting Company president Stimson Bullitt.

Editors

Until November 2008, the site's editor was former Weekly and Seattle Union Record editor Chuck Taylor, who was also a reporter, editor, and graphic designer at the Seattle Times. He left Crosscut during its transition to a nonprofit. For almost a year, the site was edited by Brewster alone until former Seattle Post-Intelligencer and Seattle Times editor Mark Matassa joined in September 2009. Matassa only stayed with Crosscut for three months, leaving in December to join the administration of new Seattle mayor Mike McGinn. He was replaced by his sister, former Times journalist Michele Matassa-Flores, and former P-I columnist Joe Copeland. Matassa-Flores left in the summer of 2011.  Crosscut was then edited by Greg Hanscom (executive editor), Drew Atkins (managing editor), and Copeland (senior editor). Florangela Davila later came on as managing editor. Currently, Victor Hernandez serves as executive editor, Mark Baumgarten serves as managing editor, and Knute Berger is the editor-at-large.

Transition to a nonprofit

On November 17, 2008, Brewster announced that a switch to nonprofit status was being explored by Crosscut LLC, which necessitated temporary staff cuts.

Brewster remained the only employee until September 2009, when grant funding finally materialized and Crosscut was able to hire an editor and support staff, including an editor, an advertising director, and eventually a Web developer. 

In October 2009, Crosscut initiated its first pledge drive. Nearly 400 people donated money to support the site's continued existence.

Acquisition by KCTS 9

On December 2, 2015, it was announced that KCTS-TV, a local PBS affiliate based in Seattle, would merge with Crosscut and another website to form Cascade Public Media.

Notable writers

 Knute Berger, who continued his column "Mossback" about the idiosyncrasies of Seattle living, history and politics, after leaving his post as editor-in-chief of the Seattle Weekly
 Charles Cross, former editor of The Rocket and Backstreets magazine, and author of several books about rock and roll history
 John Carlson, also a conservative talk radio host and television commentator
 David Kroman, city reporter, covering issues that include police reform and homelessness
 Melissa Santos. politics reporter, covering state government and the Legislature
 Samantha Larson, former science and tech reporter
 Drew Atkins, former managing editor and occasional contributor on a variety of subjects, including investigative pieces and in-depth features.
 Cambria Roth, formerly the site's Audience Engagement Coordinator, and also contributed articles
 David Brewster, a regular contributor in the site's early days.
 Chris Vance, covers politics with opinions

References

External links

Newspapers published in Seattle
2007 establishments in Washington, D.C.
American news websites